Leonid Kreutzer (13 March 1884 in St. Petersburg – 30 October 1953 in Tokyo) was a classical pianist.

Life and career
Kreutzer was born in St. Petersburg into a Jewish family. He studied composition under Alexander Glazunov and piano under Anna Yesipova. He was a highly influential piano teacher at the Berlin Academy of Music (Berliner Hochschule für Musik), together with Egon Petri. Amongst Kreutzer's students were Władysław Szpilman, Hans-Erich Riebensahm, Vladimir Horbowski, Karl-Ulrich Schnabel, Franz Osborn, Boris Berlin, Ignace Strasfogel, Franz Reizenstein and Grete Sultan. Leonid Kreutzer also gave musically and technically demanding solo recitals, mostly dedicated to specific composers or themes. At some of these, notably in June 1925, he performed works of contemporaries or modern, avant-garde composers of his time or of the recent past such as César Franck, Claude Debussy, Paul Hindemith and Paul Juon.

The Nazis targeted him prominently as a cultural enemy: Together with Frieda Loebenstein he is the one of two pianists whose name appears in a list of "tidy-up tasks" ("Aufräumungsarbeiten") compiled by Rosenberg's "Kampfbund für deutsche Kultur" (Battle-Union for German Culture). He emigrated in 1933 to Tokyo, Japan. He is also known as editor of Chopin's works at the Ullstein-Verlag. He wrote one of the first works on systematic use of the piano pedal ("Das normale Klavierpedal vom akustischen und ästhetischen Standpunkt", 1915). One of his students was the deaf pianist Ingrid Fuzjko Hemming.

There are pianos which are built under his name in Japan.

Kreutzer married one of his pupils; his daughter is the soprano Ryoko Kreutzer.

References

Sources 
 Wolfgang Rathert and Dietmar Schenk (eds.). Pianisten in Berlin: Klavierspiel und Klavierausbildung seit dem 19. Jahrhundert. Hochschule der Künste Berlin Archiv, vol. 3. Berlin, 1999.

Bibliography
 Bredow, Moritz von. 2012. "Rebellische Pianistin. Das Leben der Grete Sultan zwischen Berlin und New York." (Biography). Schott Music, Mainz, Germany.  (Contains previously unpublished image of Leonid Kreutzer and important references to his work as Professor of Piano in Berlin).

1884 births
1953 deaths
20th-century classical pianists
20th-century Japanese male musicians
Classical pianists from the Russian Empire
German classical pianists
German male classical pianists
Japanese classical pianists
Japanese male classical pianists
German emigrants to Japan
Jewish classical pianists
Jewish emigrants from Nazi Germany
Jews from the Russian Empire
Musicians from Saint Petersburg
Pupils of Anna Yesipova